Birth of a Notion is a 1947 Warner Bros. Looney Tunes cartoon directed by Bob Clampett and Robert McKimson.  The cartoon was released on April 12, 1947, and stars Daffy Duck.

Director McKimson uses his "Barnyard Dawg" character design as Leopold, the mad scientist's dog, while the scientist is a caricature, both visually and vocally, of Peter Lorre. The title is a play on The Birth of a Nation, but there is no other connection to that 1915 film.

Birth of a Notion is one of three shorts that had been scheduled for direction by Bob Clampett before he left Warner Bros. Cartoons; the other two were Bacall to Arms and The Goofy Gophers, both of which were finished by Arthur Davis. Mel Blanc voiced Daffy Duck, Leopold and Joe Besser Duck, while an uncredited Stan Freberg voiced the mad scientist.

Plot
Daffy is not going to fly south for the winter like other ducks. He manages to convince the rather simple-witted dog, Leopold, to let him stay for the winter by pretending to have saved Leopold's life. Unfortunately, Leopold's master is a mad scientist who needs the wishbone of a duck for his experiment.

Daffy is insulted by the scientist's requirement and tries to get rid of him, while Leopold interferes to save his master. At one point, Daffy throws a baseball bat at the scientist from behind, and Leopold grabs it, but cannot stop it in time from hitting the man. The scientist misunderstands, taking the bat away and calmly scolding Leopold while breaking the bat into many pieces with his bare hands before going to sleep. Daffy's assassination attempt fails and the scientist turns the tables, trying to kill Daffy with numerous booby traps around the house. Meanwhile, Leopold feels left out of the cartoon.

Daffy finally leaves, but the master decides a dog's wishbone will do, so Leopold flees as well. As Daffy starts to try to con his way into another house, a grey duck (with a Joe Besser-like personality) who is already occupying the place kicks Daffy into the sky, southbound. On his flight, he is surprised to find he has company - Leopold, aided by a fan strapped to his back, is flying south too.

References

External links
 

1947 animated films
1947 short films
1947 films
Looney Tunes shorts
Warner Bros. Cartoons animated short films
Daffy Duck films
Films directed by Robert McKimson
Mad scientist films
Cultural depictions of Peter Lorre
Films scored by Carl Stalling
1940s Warner Bros. animated short films